Real Sporting de Gijón B is a Spanish football club based in Gijón, in the autonomous community of Asturias. Founded in 1960 it is the reserve team of Sporting de Gijón, and currently plays in Tercera Federación – Group 2, holding home games at Escuela de Fútbol de Mareo with a 3,000-seat capacity.

Reserve teams in the Spanish football league system play in the same football pyramid as their senior team rather than a separate league, although reserve teams cannot play in the same division as their senior team. Reserve teams are also no longer permitted to enter the Copa del Rey. In addition, only under-23 players, or under-25 players with a professional contract, can switch between senior and reserve teams.

History

La Camocha
Sociedad Deportiva La Camocha was founded in 1955, joining the Royal Spanish Football Federation two years later. On 30 July 1966, the team signed an agreement to be affiliated with Real Gijón as their reserve team.

The following year, La Camocha's rights in Tercera División were acquired by Gijón and the team was renamed Club Atlético Gijón, being relegated to Primera Regional after three seasons.

Sporting Gijón B
Sporting de Gijón B was founded as Club Deportivo Gijón in 1960. Because the club started in the lowest level in Asturias, Segunda Regional, Real Gijón used other clubs to promote its youth players such as La Camocha. In 1970, La Camocha was replaced by Deportivo Gijón as sole affiliate after both clubs were to start in Primera Regional. La Camocha eventually became an independent club and was renamed Atlético Camocha Sociedad Deportiva. Deportivo Gijón finished as runner-up in 1971–72 and lost the promotion play-off to C.D. Acero 3–8 on aggregate, promoting to the fourth level two years later after winning the regional league.

In the following decades, Sporting B fluctuated between division four and Segunda División B, first reaching the latter in 1979–80, but being immediately relegated. In 1991, it first reached the promotion playoffs in the category, repeating the feat in 1996 and 1997, but consecutively falling short.

In early July 2011, despite finishing 19th in the third division table, with the subsequent relegation, Sporting B was reinstated in the category by buying the vacant place left by the administrative relegation of Universidad de Las Palmas CF.

In 2018, the club qualified for the promotion playoffs to Segunda División, 21 years after their last participation. The club beat Cornellà in the first round but lost the two legs against Elche in the second.

Club background
Club Deportivo Gijón (1960–79)
Sporting de Gijón Atlético CF (1979–91)
Sporting de Gijón B (1991–)

Season to season
As a farm team

As a reserve team

26 seasons in Segunda División B
15 seasons in Tercera División
2 seasons in Tercera Federación

Current squad

.

From Youth Academy

Out on loan

Current technical staff

Honours

Official
Segunda División B: 1995–96 (Group 2), 1996–97 (Group 1)
Tercera División Group 2: 1978–79, 1980–81, 1988–89, 2016–17
Copa de la Liga: 1982–83 Segunda División B – Group I
Copa RFEF (Asturias tournament): 1996, 2003, 2014, 2016

Friendly
Trofeo Emma Cuervo: 2008

Stadium
Sporting de Gijón B play most of its home games at Escuela de Fútbol de Mareo (field 1, also named Pepe Ortiz), which also acts as both the training ground and football academy for the first team. It has a capacity of 3,000 spectators.

References

External links
Official club website 
BDFútbol team profile
Sporting B history & stadium Estadios de España 

Sporting de Gijón
Spanish reserve football teams
Football clubs in Asturias
Association football clubs established in 1960
1960 establishments in Spain